Paul Eduard Crodel (7 September 1862, Cottbus - 28 July 1928, Dietramszell) was a German landscape painter and a co-founder of the Munich Secession. He was sometimes known as "Schnee-und-Regen-Crodel" (Snow-and-Rain Crodel).

Biography 
He came from a family of artists, dating back to the late 15th century. From 1882 to 1885, he studied at the Grand-Ducal Saxon Art School, Weimar, with Woldemar Friedrich and Theodor Hagen. Then, he spent three years at the Academy of Fine Arts, Karlsruhe, in the studio of Hermann Baisch. Upon completing his studies, he moved to Munich and held several showings at the Glaspalast. In 1892, he was involved in establishing the Munich Secession.

He observed the practice of painting en plein aire and became involved in the private academy, in the suburbs north of Munich, that was operated by Bernhard Buttersack. Later, possibly at the suggestion of Lehmann, who was Swiss, he explored the Alps in the vicinity of Isny and spent the winter of 1907–08 in Switzerland.

In 1909, he was called to serve on the commission of the Venice Biennale. He exhibited there that same year and again in 1910. He was on the jury of the Munich Secession in 1911 and was also a member of the Deutscher Künstlerbund; dating from their first joint exhibition with the Secession in 1904.

His daughter,  also became a painter, under his tutelage, and he promoted the career of his nephew, Charles Crodel.

References

Further reading 
 Christian Lenz, Annette Kranz: Deutsche Künstler von Marées bis Slevogt Vol.1, Adam-Hummel, Neue Pinakothek 2003.

External links

 More works by Crodel @ ArtNet

1862 births
1928 deaths
People from Cottbus
People from the Province of Brandenburg
German landscape painters
19th-century German painters
19th-century German male artists
20th-century German painters
20th-century German male artists